Detonator, also known as Shake Shake Bang Bang, is a drinking game involving smashing a beer can onto one's head. It is played across the United States, and supposedly originated among college students attending Gonzaga University.

Rules 
Detonator can be played with two or more people. Players typically gather together in an outdoor setting. Game play starts with one beer, which is still in its unopened can. Players take turns smashing the beer on their foreheads, yelling "Detonator!" as they do so. The beer can is then passed to the next player, who repeats the smashing and yelling.

Play continues until the structural integrity of the can is compromised. At this point, one player inevitably ends up covered in beer. This player is declared the winner, and all losers are required to chug a full beer.

See also

List of drinking games

References

External links

Drinking games